Liam Lawson (born 11 February 2002) is a New Zealand motor racing driver set to compete in the 2023 Super Formula Championship with Team Mugen. Lawson, who is mentored by three-time New Zealand Grand Prix winner Ken Smith, previously competed for the Carlin team in the FIA Formula 2 Championship. He is a previous Toyota Racing Series champion and member of the Red Bull Junior Team, In 2021, he also raced for the Red Bull AF Corse team in the Deutsche Tourenwagen Masters, partnering Alex Albon, narrowly missing out on the championship in the last round.

Junior racing career

Karting 
Born in Hastings but raised in Pukekohe, Lawson began karting at the age of seven, competing in numerous championships across New Zealand, including two karting titles in 2014. Each year he returns to the Kartsport Auckland Go Kart Club on Rosebank Road, Avondale and competes in the big City of Sails race on Auckland Anniversary Weekend according to Speedhive myLaps, the transponder company that was used.

Lower formulae 
In 2015, Lawson made his single-seater debut in the Formula First Manfeild Winter Series with Sabre Motorsport, taking a win and ten podiums to finish second overall. A few months later, he joined Sabre to contest the NZ Formula First championship, taking a win and three podiums on his way to sixth in the championship and the Rookie of the Year title. The following year, Lawson graduated to the NZ F1600 Championship Series. There he dominated proceedings, claiming fourteen of the fifteen victories on offer to become the youngest champion in not just the series' history, but the youngest ever Formula Ford champion in world at the time.

In 2017, Lawson moved up to the Australian F4 championship with BRM, taking five wins to finish as vice-champion in only his rookie season. The following year, Lawson remained at Formula 4 level, moving across to contest the ADAC Formula 4 championship with Van Amersfoort Racing and received backing from Turner's, the New Zealand used car network that had previously sponsored IndyCar champion Scott Dixon. Claiming three wins and three pole positions, Lawson's performances saw him claim his second consecutive F4 vice-champion position, behind Lirim Zendeli.

Toyota Racing Series 
In November 2018, Lawson joined M2 Competition for the 2019 championship. Lawson dominated on debut at Highlands, taking 2 races wins by over nine-seconds each and won the Dorothy Smith Memorial Trophy as a result of winning Race 3. Claiming three additional wins across the season, Lawson secured the title at the New Zealand Grand Prix after a season long battle with Ferrari junior and fellow countryman Marcus Armstrong.

Euroformula Open Championship 
Lawson had been set to join the inaugural season of the Formula European Masters with Motopark, alongside fellow Red Bull Junior Yuki Tsunoda, but followed the German outfit to the Euroformula Open Championship when Formula European Masters was cancelled due to a lack of entrants. Lawson won the opening races at Paul Ricard, and also in Pau. He would go on to take two more victories to become runner-up to Marino Sato. He did however, win the rookies' championship.

International Formula 3 
In November 2018, Lawson competed in the season finale of the Asian F3 championship with Irish outfit Pinnacle Motorsport. He proceeded to dominate the weekend, taking all wins, fastest laps and pole positions on offer to finish eighth in the championship.

FIA Formula 3 Championship

2019 

In March 2019, Lawson joined MP Motorsport to contest the inaugural championship, alongside Richard Verschoor and Simo Laaksonen. His debut at Barcelona, did not go well, qualifying lowest of the MP Motorsport drivers before suffering a throttle motor failure in Race 1. The second round at Paul Ricard went much better, with him scoring his first points in ninth place in Race 1 and then improving to fifth place in Race 2. The Red Bull Ring round was rather forgetful, taking 14th and 25th. An impressive qualifying saw him at Silverstone in seventh, and in Race 1 Lawson dropped back to eighth. It gave him reverse pole for Race 2. Lawson held the lead for nearly half race distance before being overtaken by Leonardo Pulcini and Robert Shwartzman, eventually finishing third. This gave him and MP Motorsport's first podium of the season. Following that, Lawson did not score at all at both the Hungary and Spa-Francorchamps rounds. At Monza, Lawson he claimed 13th. However, he managed to progress up to seventh in Race 1, giving him a front row start for Race 2. At the start, Lawson dropped to fourth after being passed by Jake Hughes and fellow Red Bull junior Yuki Tsunoda. A few laps later, he was able to pass polesitter Fabio Scherer and later re-pass Hughes. Lawson would eventually finish second behind Tsunoda, taking his second podium of the season, earning another breakthrough. Starting 23th for the final round at Sochi, Lawson only improved to 18th in Race 1. He charged back to eighth, stealing a point after overtaking Max Fewtrell and Christian Lundgaard on the last lap. Overall, Lawson was the highest scoring MP Motorsport driver with 41 points and scoring all two of the team's podiums. He finished 11th in the championship.

Macau Grand Prix 
Just two weeks after the final round, Lawson was announced to compete at that year's Macau Grand Prix, remaining with MP Motorsport. Lawson qualified 15th, but in the qualification race slipped back to 20th. What follows was a storming drive, eventually coming through to finish seventh.

2020 

The following year for the 2020 season, Lawson switched to Hitech Grand Prix, joining fellow Red Bull Junior Dennis Hauger and Max Fewtrell. Lawson qualified 12th in the Austrian race, and charged to sixth. Race 2 was much better though, improving to third. He then passed Clément Novalak and David Beckmann to move into the race lead. Despite a last minute charge from ex-teammate Richard Verschoor, Lawson managed to hold on and grab his maiden victory in the series. For the 2nd Austrian round, Lawson qualified tenth. In treacherous wet conditions in Race 1 he managed an eighth place. Starting third for Race 2, Lawson remained in the position until lap 4, where he made the double pass on Jake Hughes and Théo Pourchaire. Lawson and Hughes would then be involved in a race-long battle, constantly trading first and second with each other. On lap 21, the battle would finally come to a stop as Lawson and Hughes collided, ending both their races and handing the win to Pourchaire. A double retirement for Lawson at Hungary followed. Lawson started in eleventh, but a chaotic start saw him up to fourth within a handful of corners. Lawson's race would end on lap 5, with fire pouring out of his car prompting to his retirement. In Race 2, Lawson lost power on lap 8 and retired with an engine issue.

Lawson would then score in every race for the rest of the year. In Silverstone, Lawson missed out on a pole by 0.058s to Logan Sargeant. He would turn it around, overtaking Sargeant on the outside of Stowe corner on the opening lap. Midway through the race, he would be fend off Oscar Piastri to take his second win. In Race 2, Lawson finished seventh. For the 2nd Silverstone round, Lawson again qualified second, also behind Sargeant. Unfortunately, he was unable to repeat his previous success, this time being passed by Hughes at the start. He would end up in third, and despite the result, he stated that "the pace wasn't dissimilar" compared to his winning pace a week before. Lawson narrowly missed a podium in the second race going wide battling with Pourchaire at the penultimate corner and getting pipped by David Beckmann losing out on fourth by 0.019s. Lawson had another great qualifying in third for Barcelona, despite an engine issue likely preventing his chances for pole. Lawson stayed in third until the third last lap, where he overtook Sargeant to finish second. Lawson claimed seventh for Race 2 and his consistent podium scoring elevated him to third place in the championship.

Lawson qualified seventh in Spa-Francorchamps. He eventually finished ninth after being passed by Olli Caldwell on the penultimate lap. Starting second in Race 2, he had a torrid start, falling to fifth by the first lap, and soon sixth. But he charged back to third, including a late pass on Pourchaire. Lawson initially qualified fourth in Monza. However, following numerous penalties from other drivers saw him inherit pole position. Lawson survived an attack from the start by Matteo Nannini, but he came out with damage to his car following contact with Nannini. Lawson eventually conceded the lead to Pourchaire on lap 4. His race started going downhill from that point, eventually finishing sixth. Lawson took the Race 2 lead on lap 8, squabbling with Lirim Zendeli. But just two laps later, he was passed by Hughes. Lawson crossed the line in second, but after the race, he was demoted ten seconds for forcing Zendeli off-track, and was re-classified seventh. For the Mugello season finale, Lawson qualified a poor 13th but was promoted to 11th. In Race 1, he lingered in 11th for most of the race, until lap 17 where he passed Jack Doohan. In Race 2, Lawson led a dominant lights-to-flag victory, winning by eight seconds. Overall, Lawson finished fifth in the championship with 143 points. He claimed six podiums including three wins and a fastest lap throughout the season.

Road to Indy 
In December 2017, Lawson partook in the Mazda Road to Indy Shootout, finishing as the fastest driver but losing out on the scholarship to Ireland's Keith Donegan.

DTM 

Lawson competed in the 2021 DTM, driving a Red Bull-sponsored Ferrari for the AF Corse team alongside F1 reserve driver Alex Albon. He was taking part in the DTM concurrently with his first Formula 2 season.

On 19 June 2021, Lawson won the opening race of the 2021 DTM in Monza, becoming the youngest-ever race winner in the series. After a spin in the second Monza race cost him a points finish, he finished second in both races at the Lausitzring in the next round, where he was leading the second race until a problem in the pits cost him a win.

After failing to score points in three of the four races in the next two rounds, he got his second victory in the DTM on 4 September 2021 in the first race of the fifth round at the Red Bull Ring, which also marked the first time he started a DTM race from pole position. The following day, he went on to claim his third victory in the DTM by winning the second race at the Red Bull Ring after starting from second position.

After four podium finishes and a fourth-place finish in the next five races, Lawson qualified on pole position for the final race of the season at the Norisring. Prior to the start of the race, he was leading the drivers' championship by 19 points ahead of Kelvin van der Linde in second and 22 points ahead of Maximilian Götz in third, respectively. However, Lawson's car was damaged in a first-lap collision with van der Linde, which left him lapping 20 seconds off the pace after re-joining the race. Towards the end of the race, Mercedes gave team orders to Lucas Auer, who dominated the race, and Philip Ellis to allow Götz to claim the lead and secure his third win of the season, which put him three points ahead of Lawson in the final standings for the drivers' championship. After the race, Lawson was visibly disappointed with his second-place finish in the drivers' championship. He said he was "pushed off" by van der Linde and called the South African "the dirtiest guy [he's] ever raced against." Van der Linde was given a five-second penalty for the manoeuvre, prior to receiving a puncture in another battle with Götz in the closing stages of the race.

FIA Formula 2 Championship

2021 

Lawson took part in the 2020 post-season testing with Hitech Grand Prix. On 15 January 2021, Lawson was announced to be competing in the 2021 FIA Formula 2 Championship with them alongside Jüri Vips. Lawson qualified eighth at the opening round in Bahrain. During the first sprint race, Lawson made a good start, straightaway taking the lead from David Beckmann and Théo Pourchaire. Towards the last few laps Jehan Daruvala closed on him but Lawson was able to fend off him and thus take his maiden win on his debut. On his win, Lawson described that "[Daruvala] was a lot faster, I thought he was going to get me". However, it would be turned around in the second sprint. Lawson made good progress initially, avoiding the chaos at the start and moving up to third by Lap 5. However on Lap 15, Felipe Drugovich and Christian Lundgaard caught Lawson, in which Drugovich collided and spun him, taking him out. Lawson finished on the podium once again in third, after passing Richard Verschoor on the last lap. Lawson sat 2nd in the championship, but the weekend would turn out to be the best of the season. Lawson qualified 12th at Monaco, and made up to ninth in Sprint Race 1. Starting first after Marcus Armstrong was unable to take the grid, Lawson was overtaken by Oscar Piastri. On Lap 5, Lawson was able to get back past Piastri, making a heroic overtake on him at La Rascasse. Lawson would go on to dominate and win by seven seconds. Heartbreakingly,  he was later stripped of his victory for using a prohibited throttle map at the start of the race, handing the win to Dan Ticktum. Lawson later described his disqualification as "hard to swallow". Lawson ended his disappointing weekend in seventh in the feature race.

Lawson took his maiden pole position at the third round in Baku, forming a Hitech front row lockout. However, the first sprint race quickly ended for Lawson, when Piastri put Lawson into the wall, damaging the suspension. Lawson demonstrated a fightback in the second sprint, up to 11th on lap 4. More incidents ahead followed, and Lawson was up in sixth. However, he had to change the brake bias in the car on lap 12, losing places to Ticktum and Piastri. Despite that, Lawson passed Piastri on the very next lap to finish seventh. In the feature race, Lawson was overtaken by Jüri Vips at the first corner. He then aggressively defended against Théo Pourchaire pushing him off-track leading to a 10 second time penalty for Lawson. He put up a small charge, eventually finished sixth. Lawson qualified 11th in Silverstone, one place off reverse pole. Lawson made up positions at the start of the first sprint to finish seventh. During the second sprint, Lawson ran in fourth for majority of the race before being passed by Piastri on lap 18 of 21, eventually finishing fifth. In the feature race, Lawson had a poor race only finishing in 11th where he started.

In Monza, Lawson qualified fourth. Starting seventh for the first sprint, Lawson was up in fourth after Ticktum and Drugovich collided, However, on lap 5 while battling for third with Pourchaire, Lawson damaged his front wing and was forced to pit. He made another comeback, finishing fifth thanks to mishaps and a penalty for drivers ahead of him. Lawson drove another good race in the second sprint, finishing fourth after a late move on David Beckmann. Lawson made a superior start in the feature race, passing Jehan Daruvala and Guanyu Zhou on the first lap to second. While pitting under the safety car, Lawson was held up in the pit lane and fell back to net fourth place. On lap 22, just as he was about to overtake Daruvala, a power loss saw Lawson pull out of the race and prevent him from another point-scoring finish. Lawson qualified eighth at Sochi Autodrom. While running in third in the first sprint, Lawson damaged his rear-left suspension against the wall, ending his race. Lawson finished seventh in the feature race after a slow start. 

Lawson qualified tenth at the Jeddah Corniche Circuit and started from reverse pole in the first sprint. But into the first corner, he was out dragged by fellow kiwi Marcus Armstrong. Despite a late charge, Lawson was unable to overtake him and had to settle for second, taking his first podium since the Bahrain round. Lawson was set for a top 10 finish in the second sprint, but on the third last lap, crashed out. He finished the aborted feature race in ninth. Lawson qualified seventh for the season finale at Yas Marina. Starting fourth for the first sprint, Lawson made up a position on Ticktum to third, but eventually finished fifth after being overtaken by both Prema cars. Lawson finished sixth in the second sprint after a late pass on Daruvala. On the first lap of the feature race, Lawson spun as Jack Doohan ahead spun out of the race, but fortunately Lawson only lost a position. While running in eighth in the dying moments of the race, Lawson was forced to park his car with an engine issue. Overall, Lawson finished ninth in the championship, with 103 points. During his maiden campaign, he scored one win and three podiums.

2022 

On 14 January 2022, Lawson announced that he would race for Carlin in the 2022 season alongside American Logan Sargeant.

Lawson qualified sixth for his first race for Carlin at Bahrain. In the sprint race he achieved a third placed podium after passing Ralph Boschung late in the race. He made up a position during the start of the feature race, and when leaders where faced with obstacles on their own, Lawson kept his nose clean to take second place. Following the round, Lawson said that he was "more comfortable" in F2 following his dual campaign with DTM in 2021. Lawson qualified fifth in Jeddah and would start the sprint race in the same position. After race leader Dennis Hauger made an error going through the pitlane during the safety car, Lawson was promoted to the podium places. As soon as the safety car was withdrawn, Lawson quickly overtook Calan Williams and later Jake Hughes to take his first win of the season and second overall. Lawson was set to continue his podium streak running in third during the feature race, but a loose front-left wheel after his pitstop forced him to retire just before the exit of the pitlane. Despite that, he remained second in the championship.

Lawson had a below par qualifying in Imola, qualifying only 14th. He made a great start, moving up to tenth. He then overtook Ayumu Iwasa and then gained a position following Boschung's retirement, stealing a point in eighth. In the feature race, Lawson was set for more points, until the safety car was brought out on lap 6, which destroyed his pit strategy as he started on hards. Running in 13th after his pit stop, his steering wheel broke, slamming him into the wall and ending his race, in what was to be a frustrating weekend. Lawson once again qualifying poorly, this time even lower in 16th. He had an electric start in the sprint race, but missed points in 9th. Lawson had another good feature race start, making up seven positions at the start. After the round of pit stops, Lawson sat sixth, but with drivers behind on fresher tyres, fell to ninth at the flag.

At the Monaco round, Lawson soared to his first pole of the year. However, his lap was deleted and was relegated to fifth place after failing to slow during yellow flags. Additionally, Lawson was given a 5-place grid drop for the sprint race to start 11th. The rest of his weekend was uneventful, he gained a point in the sprint race with eighth. His car then stalled on the grid during the feature race and he would eventually retire with engine issues while running 12th. In Baku, Lawson secured second place in qualifying, behind former teammate Jüri Vips. In the sprint race, Lawson had a quiet race until the safety car restart on lap 19, where he moved from seventh to third within a minute. He would claim third place and his first podium since the second round. In the feature race, a messy pit stop saw Lawson lose a few places. Following a safety car restart, Lawson was hit from behind by Jack Doohan, which punctured Lawson's tyre and was forced back to the pits. He would finish 15th.

In Silverstone, Lawson secured fifth in qualifying. He made contact with another rival during the sprint race, sustaining front wing damage. He was forced to pit for repairs and finished 20th. In the feature race, Lawson overtook Felipe Drugovich and Frederik Vesti at the start to move into third, and stayed in that position to take another podium. For the Red Bull Ring round, Lawson qualified 14th. He stalled on the starting grid for the sprint race, and his day got worse as his car suffered problems to pull him out of the race. In the feature race, Lawson made the right call to put slick tyres at the start and it rewarded him with tenth place and a solitary point.

In Paul Ricard, Lawson ranked ninth in qualifying. Starting second in the sprint race, he was overtaken by Marcus Armstrong at the start but quickly dispatched him on lap 4. Following a safety car restart, Lawson hunted Jehan Daruvala and passed him on lap 16, to take his second win of the year. He followed his win with a sixth placed finish in the feature race.  Lawson qualified 11th in Hungary, just one place short for reverse pole. He battled to sixth place in the sprint race after making some great overtakes. In the feature race, Lawson started on the harder tyres and lost positions at the start. Despite that, he was able to make use his grippier tyres at the end to secure seventh.

At Spa-Francorchamps, Lawson qualified in sixth place. A cheeky start saw him take to the grass in the sprint race to move into second place. He then overtook Ralph Boschung on lap 2 to dominate the field and claim another win. In the feature race, Lawson had a battle with Enzo Fittipaldi in which he won out, and took a third place to cap off his best F2 weekend to date. In Zandvoort, Lawson ended qualifying in sixth position. He made up a place on Vips at the start, but ended the sprint race fourth as he was unable to overtake Hauger. In the feature race, along with a few others, Lawson started on the harder tyres. This would end up not working, as Marino Sato brought out the safety car which bunched the field mid-race. As cars were not allowed to pit under safety car conditions, Lawson ended the race 12th.

In Monza, Lawson qualified second alongside Doohan. He had an average start in the sprint race, but fell to 11th. He was involved in several duels but powered through to finish in sixth place, later promoted to fifth due to a post-race penalty from Richard Verschoor. In the feature race, a slow start for Doohan saw Lawson take the lead, but during the safety car pitted a lap later than the likes of Daruvala and Armstrong. His day got worse as he was spun around by Vips, and sustained front wing damage. He finished 13th, last of the runners. Having qualified ninth in Abu Dhabi, Lawson took his fourth victory of the season in the sprint race, having conserved his tyres better than Verschoor, whom he overtook on lap 10. In the feature race, he pitted early, and found himself in third place which was where he eventually finished. Lawson ended third in the driver's championship with 149 points, whilst claiming four victories and six other podiums.

Formula One 
In February 2019, Lawson joined the Red Bull Junior Team.

In July 2021, he got his first taste of an F1 car at the 2021 Goodwood Festival Of Speed, driving the 2011 Red Bull RB7. Lawson took part of the Abu Dhabi Young Driver Test at the end of the 2021 season with Scuderia AlphaTauri, driving the AT02. For the 2022 season, he serves as a reserve/test driver for AlphaTauri. In March 2022 Franz Tost revealed that Lawson would make his Formula One debut in a free practice session for them during the season. He made his first free practice debut at the 2022 Belgian Grand Prix, combining with his F2 weekend.

Following Jüri Vips' racial slur during a Twitch livestream (in which, incidentally, Lawson was also present) during June 2022, Christian Horner confirmed that Lawson had been promoted to replace the latter as the reserve driver for Red Bull Racing, sharing this role with AlphaTauri. Lawson made another FP1 appearance with AlphaTauri at the 2022 Mexico City Grand Prix. He made his Red Bull debut during practice at the season-ending . Lawson then took part in the post-season tests in Abu Dhabi driving the Red Bull.

Super Formula

2023 season 
Lawson left F2 at the end of 2022 and is set to contest in the 2023 Super Formula Championship with Team Mugen alongside reigning champion Tomoki Nojiri.

Racing record

Career summary 

* Season still in progress.

Complete NZ Formula F1600 Championship Series results 
(key) (Races in bold indicate pole position) (Races in italics indicate fastest lap)

Complete Australian Formula 4 Championship results 
(key) (Races in bold indicate pole position) (Races in italics indicate fastest lap)

Complete ADAC Formula 4 Championship results 
(key) (Races in bold indicate pole position) (Races in italics indicate fastest lap)

Complete F3 Asian Championship results 
(key) (Races in bold indicate pole position) (Races in italics indicate fastest lap)

Complete Euroformula Open results 
(key) (Races in bold indicate pole position) (Races in italics indicate fastest lap)

Complete Toyota Racing Series results 
(key) (Races in bold indicate pole position) (Races in italics indicate fastest lap)

Complete FIA Formula 3 Championship results 
(key) (Races in bold indicate pole position; races in italics indicate points for the fastest lap of top ten finishers)

‡ Half points were awarded, as less than 75% of the scheduled distance was completed.

Complete Macau Grand Prix results

Complete FIA Formula 2 Championship results 
(key) (Races in bold indicate pole position) (Races in italics indicate points for the fastest lap of top ten finishers)

‡ Half points awarded as less than 75% of race distance was completed.
† Driver did not finish the race, but were classified, as they completed more than 90% of the race distance.

Complete Deutsche Tourenwagen Masters results 
(key) (Races in bold indicate pole position) (Races in italics indicate fastest lap)

Complete Formula One participations 
(key) (Races in bold indicate pole position) (Races in italics indicate fastest lap)

* Season still in progress.

City of Sails Appearance 2022

Complete Super Formula results
(key) (Races in bold indicate pole position; races in italics indicate fastest lap)

References

External links
 
 

2002 births
Living people
New Zealand racing drivers
Formula Ford drivers
ADAC Formula 4 drivers
Toyota Racing Series drivers
FIA Formula 3 Championship drivers
F3 Asian Championship drivers
FIA Formula 2 Championship drivers
Deutsche Tourenwagen Masters drivers
Van Amersfoort Racing drivers
M2 Competition drivers
MP Motorsport drivers
Motopark Academy drivers
Hitech Grand Prix drivers
AF Corse drivers
Sportspeople from Hastings, New Zealand
Pinnacle Motorsport drivers
Carlin racing drivers
Super Formula drivers
Mugen Motorsports drivers
Australian F4 Championship drivers